Korean consonants may refer to:

 Consonant sounds in the Korean language
 Consonant letters of the Korean alphabet (Hangul)